Tapasya is a 1992 Nepalese movie produced by Roshana Films. It is directed by Narayan Puri. It stars Saroj Khanal, Gauri Malla, Beena Basnet, and Karishma Manandhar in lead roles.

Cast 

Nepalese drama films